Justice Traps the Guilty was an American comic book title, a publication of the crime comics genre created by Joe Simon and Jack Kirby and published by Prize Comics from 1947 to 1958. It followed the successful revamping of Headline Comics (For The American Boy) by Simon and Kirby, beginning in March 1947.

Publication history 
Justice Traps the Guilty  began with an October/November 1947 issue. It returned to newsstands in the first part of 1948. Simon and Kirby accounted for the majority of the covers, along with one or two stories in each issue. 

The last issue was #92, which was published in May 1958.

References

Comics magazines published in the United States
Crestwood Publications titles
Crime comics
1947 comics debuts
1958 comics endings
Comics by Jack Kirby
Works by Joe Simon
Magazines established in 1947
Magazines disestablished in 1958
Defunct American comics